Cerradopatus is a monospecific genus of velvet worm containing the single species Cerradopatus sucuriuensis. Males of this species have 28 or 29 pairs of legs; females have 30 to 32. This species is native to the Brazilian savannah. This species is viviparous, with mothers supplying nourishment to their embryos through a placenta.

References 

Onychophoran genera
Onychophorans of tropical America
Monotypic protostome genera
Animals described in 2015